The Erkel Theatre is a theatre in Budapest, Hungary. Being the largest public building in the city for decades (and the largest theatre in the city), it was made part of the Hungarian State Opera House in 1951.

History

With the idea of bringing opera to the masses for cheap, originally named Népopera (The People's Opera), the theatre was planned and built by the Népopera JSC (funded largely by the Budapest city council). The council provided the plot for free, but in return it regulated the theatre's operation: among other requirements, it had to employ a permanent Hungarian company, and the language of the plays had to be Hungarian.

Designed by Dezső Jakab, Marcell Komor and Géza Márkus, the theatre was completed in 9 months. Equipped with modern machinery, including an organ, it had a 14 wide and 8.5 meter tall stage. The auditorium was similarly large, with a size of 40x10 meters. Intended for the working masses, the theatre was simplistic in style, except for a large mural made by Bertalan Pór. The premiere was held on 7 December 1911.

While it was home to a number of critically acclaimed and successful shows, including a season featuring the complete works of Richard Wagner, after a few years, the idea of an Opera house for the working class proved to be impossible to realize. After the start of World War I, The People's Opera was shut down in 1915. In 1917 Gábor Faludi modernized the building, reduced the number of seats to 2400, and changed the name to Városi Színház (City Theatre). For the next three decades, the theatre became home to a number of tenants and theatre companies, and with them, to a number of various genres and styles.

Between 1940 and 1945 the theatre was managed directly by the city council as an art center, showing guest plays by the Opera House and the National Theatre, along with various literary events and concerts. From 1946, the building operated as a movie theatre for two years.

From 1948 it got back its original function, and in 1951 the building was brought under the supervision of the state Opera House, and operated as its secondary stage until its 2007 closure. The theatre was renamed to Erkel Theatre in 1953 after the composer Ferenc Erkel. Significant renovations took place in 1961.

The theatre was closed between June 2007 and March 2013, when it reopened after renovations. It serves as a second scene for the Hungarian State Opera.

External links
 Opera.hu - The website of the Hungarian State Opera House, the owner of the building

Sources
 - The Erkel Theatre in the Hungarian Theatrical Lexicon (György, Székely. Magyar Színházművészeti Lexikon. Budapest: Akadémiai Kiadó, 1994. ), freely available on mek.oszk.hu (in Hungarian)
 The People's Theatre (Study) (in Hungarian)

References

Buildings and structures in Budapest
Culture in Budapest
Theatres completed in 1911
Theatres in Budapest
1911 establishments in Austria-Hungary